Eospilarctia pauper is a moth of the family Erebidae first described by Charles Oberthür in 1911. It is found in the Chinese provinces of Sichuan and Yunnan.

References

Moths described in 1911
Spilosomina